Cordulegaster helladica is a species of dragonfly in the family Cordulegastridae. It is endemic to Greece.  Its natural habitats are subtropical or tropical dry forests, rivers, and freshwater springs. It is threatened by habitat loss.

Sources 

Cordulegastridae
Dragonflies of Europe
Endemic fauna of Greece
Insects described in 1993
Taxonomy articles created by Polbot